Jan Kagie (1907 in The Hague – 1991 in Amsterdam) was a Dutch painter.

He became a pupil of his father, Johannes Leonardus Kagie. He traveled with Anton Heyboer to France in 1947.

Kagie won an Arti medal in 1984 and became a member of Arti et Amicitiae during the years 1969–1984.

References

External links 

Jan Kagie on Artnet

1907 births
1991 deaths
Artists from The Hague
20th-century Dutch painters
Dutch male painters
20th-century Dutch male artists